Buena Vista County is a county located in the U.S. state of Iowa. As of the 2020 census, the population was 20,823. Its county seat is Storm Lake. The county is named for the final victory of Field General Zachary Taylor in the Mexican–American War.

Buena Vista County comprises the Storm Lake, IA Micropolitan Statistical Area.

History
Buena Vista County was formed on January 15, 1851, from open land. It was named in memory of the Battle of Buena Vista in the Mexican-American War ending in 1848; the victorious United States annexed considerable territory as a result.

Geography

Major highways
  U.S. Highway 71
  Iowa Highway 3
  Iowa Highway 7
  Iowa Highway 10
  Iowa Highway 110

Adjacent counties
 Clay County (north)
 Pocahontas County (east)
 Sac County (south)
 Cherokee County (west)

Demographics

2020 census
There were 8,141 housing units of which 7,447 were occupied.

2010 census
There were 8,237 housing units, of which 7,522 were occupied.

2000 census

As of the census of 2000, there were 20,411 people, 7,499 households, and 5,121 families residing in the county. The population density was 36 people per square mile (14/km2). There were 8,145 housing units at an average density of 14 per square mile (5/km2). The racial makeup of the county was 88.00% White, 0.35% Black or African American, 0.13% Native American, 4.33% Asian, 0.01% Pacific Islander, 5.75% from other races, and 1.42% from two or more races. 12.54% of the population were Hispanic or Latino of any race.

2005 Census estimates of the racial origins of Buena Vista County's population indicated it had the lowest percentage of non-Hispanic Whites of any county in Iowa. The non-Hispanic whites constituted 76.1% of the county's population, with African-Americans being 1.3%, Asians 3.9% and Latinos 18.6% of the population.

There were 7,499 households, out of which 31.90% had children under the age of 18 living with them, 57.50% were married couples living together, 7.20% had a female householder with no husband present, and 31.70% were non-families. 27.00% of all households were made up of individuals, and 13.20% had someone living alone who was 65 years of age or older. The average household size was 2.54 and the average family size was 3.08.

In the county, the population was spread out, with 25.40% under the age of 18, 12.20% from 18 to 24, 25.40% from 25 to 44, 20.20% from 45 to 64, and 16.90% who were 65 years of age or older. The median age was 36 years. For every 100 females there were 100.40 males. For every 100 females age 18 and over, there were 97.40 males.

The median income for a household in the county was $35,300, and the median income for a family was $41,549. Males had a median income of $29,172 versus $20,252 for females. The per capita income for the county was $16,042. About 7.60% of families and 10.50% of the population were below the poverty line, including 12.60% of those under age 18 and 7.60% of those age 65 or over.

Law enforcement

Law enforcement is the responsibility of the Buena Vista County Sheriff's Office (BVSO). The department provides law enforcement services for all areas of Buena Vista County, as well as providing for courthouse security, operating the county jail, and performing civil procedures. The current Sheriff is Kory Elston. The staff includes a mix of full-time deputies and reserve deputies.

The Buena Vista County Sheriff's Office is located at 411 Expansion Blvd in Storm Lake, Iowa.

Reserve officers from the Buena Vista County Sheriff's Office received the Donald H. Mackaman Outstanding Unit Award at the 2013 state reserve conference.

Communities

Cities

 Albert City
 Alta
 Lakeside
 Linn Grove
 Marathon
 Newell
 Rembrandt
 Sioux Rapids
 Storm Lake
 Truesdale

Townships
Buena Vista County is divided into sixteen townships:

 Barnes
 Brooke
 Coon
 Elk
 Fairfield
 Grant
 Hayes
 Lee
 Lincoln
 Maple Valley
 Newell
 Nokomis
 Poland
 Providence
 Scott
 Washington

Population ranking
The population ranking of the following table is based on the 2020 census of Buena Vista County.

† county seat

Politics
Buena Vista County has mostly voted Republican throughout its history, only failing to back the party's candidates in a presidential election eight times throughout its history. The first of these instances was in 1912 when the Republican vote was split between incumbent William Howard Taft & former President Theodore Roosevelt, who won a majority of the county's votes as a third-party candidate. Five of the instances were national landslides for the Democratic Party in all four of Franklin D. Roosevelt's victories as well as Lyndon B. Johnson's 1964 landslide. The other two Democratic victories were in 1948 as Harry S. Truman narrowly won the county & statewide by a similar margin, & 40 years later in 1988 as Michael Dukakis was boosted statewide by the 1980s farm crisis despite his national landslide loss.

See also

 National Register of Historic Places listings in Buena Vista County, Iowa

References

External links

 Buena Vista County government's website
 Genealogy: Buena Vista County Iowa History & Heritage Project

 
1851 establishments in Iowa
Populated places established in 1851